Kjetil Byfuglien (born 23 May 1977 in Oslo) is a retired Norwegian football defender.

Byfuglien played for Haga IF, NTG and Stabæk IF before joining Asker SK. While with Asker, he had a trial with English side Torquay United in November 2001 and was set for a trial with Queens Park Rangers later the same month.

He joined Kongsvinger IL in 2002 and played mostly left wing, but later during his stay he appeared more often at left-back. In October 2006 he left to join Hønefoss BK. In 2010, he made his debut for Hønefoss in the Norwegian Premier League. He finished his career at Jevnaker IF.

References

1977 births
Living people
People from Nes, Akershus
Norwegian footballers
Stabæk Fotball players
Asker Fotball players
Kongsvinger IL Toppfotball players
Hønefoss BK players
Eliteserien players
Norwegian First Division players
Jevnaker IF players
Association football defenders
Sportspeople from Viken (county)